Chrysocale gigantea is a moth of the subfamily Arctiinae. It was described by Herbert Druce in 1890. It is found in Colombia and Bolivia.

References

Euchromiina
Moths described in 1890